Theresa Ann "Tess" Contos (born September 15, 1959 in Syracuse, New York) is an American former handball player who competed in the 1984 Summer Olympics.

References

External links
 
 

1959 births
Living people
Sportspeople from Syracuse, New York
American female handball players
Olympic handball players of the United States
Handball players at the 1984 Summer Olympics
21st-century American women